This is a list of Los Angeles federal buildings, meaning past or present United States federal buildings located within the city of Los Angeles. (It includes buildings that, prior to the creation of the USPS as an independent agency in 1971, contained post offices but no buildings that were exclusively post offices.) Since 1974, the General Services Administration manages most federal buildings.
 First Los Angeles federal building, Main and Winston, in use 1892 to ~1901, demolished
 Second Los Angeles federal building, 312 Spring St., in use beginning 1910, demolished 1934; Spring Street Courthouse built on same location
 Spring Street Courthouse, 312 Spring St., NRHP, federal courthouse 1940 to 2016, now county courthouse, still houses other federal departments
 New United States Courthouse, 350 W. First St., in use since 2016
 Wilshire Federal Building, 11000 Wilshire Blvd., NRHP, opened 1969
 Edward R. Roybal Federal Building and United States Courthouse, 255 E Temple St., opened 1996
 300 North Los Angeles Street Federal Building, across the street from Roybal, opened 1965, NRHP
 James C. Corman Federal Building, 6230 Van Nuys Blvd. at Van Nuys Government Center, opened 1974
 Federal Reserve Bank of San Francisco, Los Angeles Branch, 409 W. Olympic Blvd., opened 1929, NRHP, original building is now residential, bank operations are in 1988 building next door

See also
  (NRHP)
 List of United States federal courthouses in California

References 

Government buildings in Los Angeles